Geoffrey John Moriarty (28 October 1871 – 29 October 1948) was an Australian rules footballer who played for the Fitzroy Football Club in the VFA and Victorian Football League (VFL).

The father of Fitzroy full-forward Jack Moriarty, Geoff played at the opposite end of the ground, and after a year with Carlton, he crossed to Fitzroy, becoming a premiership winning fullback. He was a member of Fitzroy premiership sides in 1895 in the VFA, and in 1899 and 1905, also playing in their losing Grand Finals in 1900 and 1906.

In 1911 Moriarty became Fitzroy's first ever official coach, with the club finishing fifth on both of his two seasons in charge.

See also
List of Fitzroy Football Club coaches

References

External links

 
 Geoff Moriarty's coaching record at AFL Tables.

1871 births
1948 deaths
Carlton Football Club (VFA) players
Fitzroy Football Club players
Fitzroy Football Club Premiership players
Fitzroy Football Club coaches
Australian rules footballers from Victoria (Australia)
Two-time VFL/AFL Premiership players